Kirby-le-Soken is a village and former civil parish, now in the parish of Frinton and Walton, in the Tendring district of North East Essex, England, which is mainly agricultural, but increasingly residential, near Frinton-on-Sea and Walton-on-the-Naze. In 2018 the built-up-area had an estimated population of 1387. In 1931 the parish had a population of 836. On 1 April 1934 the parish was abolished to form "Frinton and Walton", part also went to Thorpe le Soken.

Kirby-le-Soken is in an area called The Sokens, isolated from Kirby Cross, Frinton-on-Sea and Walton-on-the-Naze by fields.

References

The Kirby-le-Soken History Pages
Kirby-le-Soken Village Preservation Society
Kirby-le-Soken War Memorial details

Villages in Essex
Former civil parishes in Essex
Tendring